Phoebe Snow is the debut album by American roots music singer-songwriter Phoebe Snow, released in 1974. It contains her Top 5 Billboard hit, "Poetry Man", and opens with her cover of Sam Cooke's R&B hit "Good Times".

Background
Sessions were held in Los Angeles, Nashville and in Tulsa to find the right approach for the album. "She’d play with whoever was around and we’d record and analyze the recordings, try and work out what was ideal for each song, which approach to take," said Shelter president Denny Cordell. "I think she found that rather a long and painful study, but it obviously had its rewards." After the album's release, legal battles took place between Snow and Shelter Records. Snow eventually signed with Columbia Records. It would be two years before her next release on Columbia.

Reception

In a retrospective review for Allmusic, critic Alex Henderson called Snow "a pearl of a singer who never caught on because she simply didn't fit neatly into any one category... With as many risks as she takes, the album is generally quite accessible." Robert Christgau called the album "This woman's languorous, swaying folk-jazz fusion is striking enough to suggest that her debut LP will become some sort of cult item. And it's better than most cult items... The plus is for encouragement, and for the graceful way her voice combines nasality and smoothness."

Track listing
All songs by Phoebe Snow, except where noted

"Good Times" (Sam Cooke) – 2:20
"Harpo's Blues" – 4:22
"Poetry Man" – 4:36
"Either or Both" – 3:52
"San Francisco Bay Blues" (Jesse Fuller) – 3:29
"I Don't Want the Night to End" – 3:55
"Take Your Children Home" – 4:15
"It Must Be Sunday" – 5:50
"No Show Tonight" – 2:57

CD (DCC label Only) bonus tracks
"Easy Street" [original "B Side" of Harpo's Blues single] – 3:20
"Good Times" [original demo] (Cooke) – 2:39
"Harpo's Blues" [original demo] – 4:55
"I Don't Want the Night to End" [original demo] – 3:55
"It Must Be Sunday" [original demo] – 6:42
"San Francisco Bay Blues" [original demo] (Fuller) – 4:09
"Poetry Man" [original demo] – 3:43

Personnel 
 Phoebe Snow – vocals, acoustic guitar
 Bob James – organ (2, 3, 6, 7, 8)
 Teddy Wilson – acoustic piano (2)
 Steve Burgh – electric guitar (1, 6, 9)
 David Bromberg – lead acoustic guitar (4), rhythm guitar (4), dobro (4)
 Dave Mason – lead electric guitar (9)
 Hugh McDonald – electric bass (1, 6, 9)
 Chuck Domanico – acoustic bass (2, 3, 7, 8)
 Chuck Israels – acoustic bass (5)
 Steve Mosley – drums (1, 2, 6, 9), percussion (8)
 Ralph MacDonald – percussion (2, 3, 7)
 Margaret Ross – harp (2, 3, 7)
 Zoot Sims – tenor saxophone (2, 3, 8)
 The Persuasions – backing vocals (1)

Production 
 Dino Airali – producer 
 Phil Ramone – co-producer, engineer, mixing
 Steve Hoffman – engineer 
 Tom Baker – assistant engineer 
 Glenn Berger – assistant engineer 
 Bob Schaper – assistant engineer 
 Roberta Ballard – production manager 
 Ed Caraeff – photography 
 Mick Haggerty – cover artwork 
 Recorded at A & R Recording (New York, NY) and Producer's Workshop (Hollywood, CA).
 Mixed at A & R Recording

Charts

Certifications

References

Phoebe Snow albums
1974 debut albums
Albums produced by Denny Cordell
Albums produced by Phil Ramone
Shelter Records albums